Melvin Carl Dunlap (June 9, 1945 - September 12, 2021) was an American bass player, noted for his work with Charles Wright and Bill Withers.

Dunlap was born in Cleveland, Ohio. While suffering from an extended childhood illness, he began practicing on an old Fender bass which his adoptive parents bought for him from a pawn shop. After playing with various local bands, he joined The O'Jays as their touring bass player. Dunlap subsequently settled in California where he worked several odd jobs while trying to make a living as a musician.

Dunlap joined Charles Wright & the Watts 103rd Street Rhythm Band and played on the 1970 hit Express Yourself. He later became a regular member of Bill Withers' band, playing on the hits Lean on Me and Use Me. He also co-produced some of Withers' albums, and has a few shared songwriting credits with Withers. In 2009 and 2012 he released two self-produced albums of what he called "holistic funk".

Personal life and death
Melvin Dunlap is survived by his 7 Children, Kneekol Dunlap, Shonya Dunlap, Lamount Dunlap, Dominic Dunlap, Troy Dunlap and Trevor Dunlap 

Melvin died peacefully in his sleep at home in Los Angeles, California on September 12, 2021

References

1945 births
2021 deaths
Musicians from Cleveland
20th-century American bass guitarists
American male bass guitarists
20th-century American male musicians
20th-century African-American musicians
American rhythm and blues bass guitarists